Setia miae is a species of minute sea snail, a marine gastropod mollusk or micromollusk in the family Rissoidae.

Description

Distribution

References

  Verduin A. (1988). On the taxonomy of some Rissoacean species from Europe, Madeira and the Canary Islands. Basteria 52: 9-35

Rissoidae
Gastropods described in 1988